The flame-templed babbler (Dasycrotapha speciosa) is a species of bird of the family Zosteropidae, in the genus Dasycrotapha. It is one of the most remarkable and distinctive birds with its complex head markings with orange crown tufts, black ears and yellow beak and face. It is endemic to the Philippines, where it is found on the islands of Panay and Negros. Its natural habitat is tropical moist lowland forest. It is threatened by habitat loss. Along with the Negros striped babbler, it is one of the two babbler species extremely sought after by birdwatchers on Negros.

Description 

EBird describes the bird as "A small bird. Has a gray back with fine pale streaks, golden flight feathers, a yellowish belly, a brighter yellow chest extending around the collar, a black head with black spots on the upper chest, and a yellow bill, forehead, chin, and short moustache stripe. Note the white-streaked cheek and the orange tufts on the back of the head. Often joins mixed-species flocks, where it methodically forages in the understory and at middle heights in the forest. Unmistakable. Song is a descending whistled warble."

The flame-templed babbler is an omnivore feeding on small insects and berries, flowers and figs. These babblers feed and breed in understory bushes, trees, vines and ferns.

Habitat and Conservation Status 
The flame-templed babbler inhabits lowland forest, forest edge and secondary growth below 1,000 m, occasionally occurring up to 1,180 m. Highest densities have been recorded in the thick undergrowth of degraded secondary forest and observations come from the lower strata (up to 8 m) in the understory, where birds stay in deep cover and are consequently unobtrusive unless singing.

IUCN has assessed this bird as endangered  estimating the population to be just 2,500 - 9,999 mature individuals. In areas where habitat is still good, they occur in high densities of more than 20 birds per square kilometer; however, overall remaining habitat is greatly reduced. It was only  fairly recently discovered in Panay in 1987 and is only found in five localities.

This species' main threat is habitat loss with wholesale clearance of forest habitats as a result of logging, agricultural conversion and mining activities occurring within the range. Negros Island is one of the most deforested areas in the country due to its sugar industry and logging with most of its forests being totally lost before the 21st century. Forest cover on Negros and Panay is just 3% and 6% respectively and these figures are still declining.

It occurs in a few protected areas within Mt. Kanlaon Natural Park and Northern Negros Natural Park; however, protection and enforcement against deforestation is lax. It also occurs in the proposed Central Panay Mountain Range Park which  contains the largest block of remaining forest in the Western Visayas, and the tourist destination of Twin Lakes (Mount Talinis). Both sites benefit from conservation funding but are still under threat by deforestation.

References

Further reading
 Collar, N. J. & Robson, C. 2007. Family Timaliidae (Babblers)  pp. 70 – 291 in; del Hoyo, J., Elliott, A. & Christie, D.A. eds. Handbook of the Birds of the World, Vol. 12. Picathartes to Tits and Chickadees. Lynx Edicions, Barcelona.

External links
BirdLife Species Factsheet.
Image at ADW

flame-templed babbler
Birds of Negros Island
Birds of Panay
flame-templed babbler
flame-templed babbler
Taxonomy articles created by Polbot